Rising From The East is an album by a UK based Indian DJ Bally Sagoo in 1996.

Track listing

1996 albums